Statistics of Nemzeti Bajnokság I in the 1965 season.

Overview
It was contested by 14 teams, and Vasas SC won the championship.

League standings

Results

Statistical leaders

Top goalscorers

References
Hungary - List of final tables (RSSSF)

Nemzeti Bajnokság I seasons
1964–65 in Hungarian football
1965–66 in Hungarian football
Hun
Hun